Jean Frédéric Adolphe Salvat, died in Paris in 1876, was a 19th-century French playwright.

His plays were presented on the most important Parisian stages of his time, including the Théâtre des Variétés, Théâtre de la Porte-Saint-Antoine, the Théâtre du Vaudeville, and the Théâtre des Folies-Dramatiques.

Works 
1837: Le Chemin de fer de Saint-Germain, one-act à-propos-vaudeville, with Jean Pierre Charles Perrot de Renneville and Henri de Tully
1838: Les Femmes libres, three-act folie-vaudeville and extravaganza, with Pierre Tournemine
1839: Le Mauvais sujet, one-act comédie en vaudevilles, with Charles Labie and Joanny Augier
1840: L'Île de Calypso, one-act folie-vaudeville, with Joanny Augier
1842: Duchesse et poissarde, two-act comédie en vaudevilles, with Joanny Augier
1843: La Jeune et la vieille garde, épisode de 1814, in 1 act, with Clairville, 1843
1845: Les Deux tambours, one-act comédie en vaudevilles, with Lubize and Edmond-Frédéric Prieur
1847: La Fille du diable, one-act vaudeville fantastique, with Hippolyte Rimbaut
1850: La Grenouille du régiment, one-act comédie en vaudevilles, with Lubize
1853: La Petite Provence, one-act comédie en vaudevilles, with Édouard Brisebarre
1858: L'Agent matrimonial, one-act comédie en vaudevilles, with Perrot de Renneville
1859: Taureau le brasseur, one-act comédie en vaudevilles, with Rimbaut
undated: Le Revers de la médaille, two-act comédie en vaudevilles

Bibliography 
 Joseph-Marie Quérard, Charles Louandre, La littérature française contemporaine: XIXe siècle, 1857,  (read online)

19th-century French dramatists and playwrights
Year of birth missing
1876 deaths